Henryk Firlej (1574–1626) was a Polish szlachcic, bishop of Łuck (1616–1617), Archbishop of Gniezno and Primate of Poland from 1624; Deputy Chancellor of the Crown.

External links
Catholic-Hierarchy entry
 Virtual tour Gniezno Cathedral  
List of Primates of Poland 

Ecclesiastical senators of the Polish–Lithuanian Commonwealth
1574 births
1626 deaths
Polish nobility
Archbishops of Gniezno
17th-century Roman Catholic archbishops in the Polish–Lithuanian Commonwealth
Henryk
Bishops of Płock
Crown Vice-Chancellors